Hieslum is a small village in Súdwest-Fryslân in the province of Friesland, the Netherlands. It had a population of around 90 in January 2017.

History
The village was first mentioned between 825 and 842 as Hasalon, and means "settlement near hazel trees (corylus avellana)". Hieslum is a terp (artificial living hill) living which used to be located between lakes, however the lakes have been poldered.

The Dutch Reformed church was built in 1874 as a replacement of a church from around 1300. It is almost identical to the church of Idsegahuizum.

Hieslum was home to 64 people in 1840. Before 2011, the village was part of the Wûnseradiel municipality.

References

External links

Súdwest-Fryslân
Populated places in Friesland